The BBK DAV College for Women is a college in Amritsar, India.

BBK DAV College for Women, Amritsar, was founded in the 1967 under the aegis of DAV College Managing Committee, New Delhi.

Academics

The academic year has semester system consisting of two terms - July to December and January to June. All undergraduate, postgraduate and diploma programmes require full time commitment from the students and the system does not exempt them from any compulsory activities.

Programmes Available 
BA (Bachelor of Arts) with the following subject options: 
Regular Subjects
 English
 Hindi
 Punjabi / Punjab History & Culture
 Psychology
 Sociology
 History
 Political Science
 Home Science
 Philosophy
 Geography
 Physical Education
 Economics
 Music Vocal
 Music Instrumental
 Art & Painting
 Computer Science
 Computer Applications
 Mathematics

Vocational Subjects
 Mass Communication Video Production
 Still Photography Audio Production
 Commercial Art
 Gemology & Jewellery Design
 Fashion Designing & Garment Construction
 Tourism & Travel Management
 Dance

Undergraduate Degree Courses 

 B.Voc. Entertainment Technology
 B.Voc. Theatre & Stage Craft
 B.Voc. Fashion Technology
 B.Voc. Software Development
 B.Voc. Beauty & Fitness
 B.Voc. Retail Management
 B.Voc. Financial Services
 B.Sc. Medical with Bioinformatics as subject option (3 years)
 B.Sc. Non-Medical with Bioinformatics as subject option  (3 years)
 B.Sc. Biotechnology (3 years)
 B.Sc. Economics with Computer Science & Mathematics/ Quantitative Techniques.  (3 years)
 B.Sc. Computer Science with Physics, Mathematics & Computer Science  (3 years)
 BCA (Bachelor in Computer Applications)  (3 years)
 B.Sc IT (Bachelor in Science in Information Technology) (3 years)
 BA English Honours (3 years)
 B.Com Pass & Honours (3 years)
 B.Com. Financial Services (3 years)
 BBA (Bachelor of Business Administration) (3 years)
 B.Design (Bachelor of Design) - 4 Year Degree Course with specialization in Textile, Interior & Fashion Designing.
 B.Design (Multimedia) (4 year Degree Course)
 BFA in Applied Art/Painting (4 years)
 BA Journalism & Mass Communication

Post Graduate Courses 

 MA Fine Arts
 MA Commercial Art
 MA English
 Masters in Journalism & Mass Communication
 Masters in Tourism Management
 MA Media Studies & Production 
 M.Com 
 M.Sc. Computer Science 
 M.Sc. Internet Studies
 M.Sc. Fashion Designing & Merchandising

Diplomas 
 
 PG Diploma in Computer Applications (PGDCA)
 PG Diploma in Bioinformatics
 PG Diploma in Financial Services (Banking & Insurance)
 One Year Diploma Course in French
 Clinical Diagnostic Techniques

Add-On Courses 

 French
 Communication Skills in English
 Cosmetology
 Computer Fundamentals & Internet Applications
 Computer Graphics & Animation
 Interior Decoration
 Office Management & Secretarial Practices
 Food Preservation
 Anchoring, Reporting & News Reading

Cultural activities

The college recreated history by lifting  Overall Championship Trophy in Inter-Zonal Youth Festival of GNDU After 19 Years. The college won the championship trophy by scoring 120 marks and winning positions in all the 26 events in which the college participated. The college emerged champion in literary, theatre & folk events while bagging runners-up positions in the category of Fine Arts & Music. Participants made their mark by winning 1st position in 11 events, namely Kavishri, Folk Song, On the Spot Painting, Collage, Phulkari, Skit, Fancy Dress, Quiz, Debate, Poetry and Gidha, 2nd position in 13 events, namely Folk Orchestra, General Dance, Classical Vocal, Non Percussion, Classical Dance, Group Song, Vaar Singing, Western Solo, Rangoli, Play, Mime, Elocution and Poster Making and 3rd position in 2 items namely Western Group and Group Bhajan. College student Suvidha Duggal was presented the Best Actress (Theatre) Award and Simran from Gidha team won the award for Best Dancer.

The college has ties with international institutes for educational and cultural exchange. It has links with the educational organizations  WCCI (World Council of Curriculum & Instructions)], World Education Foundation, Kent County Council, Technology College, Northfleet and Hextable School, and World Punjabi Congress, Lahore, Pakistan.

In July 2004, a group of 16 students and teachers presented as many as 50 programmes including the play Is Jagah Ek Gaon Tha at Woodville Halls Theatre, Gravesend, UK.  The college dance troupe was part of the Indian Fair that was declared first among the 32 countries that participated in the Dubai International Dance Festival. The college artists presented a one-hour programme at Wagha Border for the release of a documentary titled Sarhad ke Rakshak. The play Umrao Jaan participated in a five-day National Drama Festival organized by Urdu Academy, New Delhi. One College student represented Punjab at the festival of Teej celebrated in Gravesend, England. In 2008-09, the college folk artistes were part of a delegation to China selected by the government of India.

Sports

The college has in its alumni Arjuna Awardee, an Olympian Harwant Kaur, a Gold medalist in the Asian Games and players at the international level. The college’s investment in sports is 55 lacs per year and it provides the latest equipment for all the sports events of Guru Nanak Dev University, Amritsar. The college has made a tremendous contribution to university sports, adding a major share in Guru Nanak Dev University’s feat of winning Maulana Abul Kalam Azad All India Trophy for Sports year after year. Its players have been members of the Indian contingent for the Asian Games and Commonwealth Games. A large number of players of this college have represented the university at intervarsity level and won Gold, Silver and Bronze medals.

Continuing its winning streak BBK DAV College for Women lifted overall General Sports Championship Trophy consecutively for the seventh time and a cash award of rupees 35 lakhs. 150 outstanding players of the college, who excelled in different games received rupees 35 lakhs approximately as prize money by Shri. Rahul Bhatnagar, IAS, Secretary Department of Youth Affairs and Sports, Government of India, New Delhi and Dr. Gurdeep Singh, Joint Secretary, AIU New Delhi, oh the 48th Annual Sports prize distribution function 2017-18 at Dashmesh Auditorium, GNDU Campus. Five international cyclists of the college, Ms. Nayana Rajesh.P , Amritha Regunath, Aleena Reji, Vaishnavi Gabhane and Ms. Aashu Sharma got maximum cash prize of Rs. 4,28,000, Rs. 3,46,000, Rs. 2,40,000, Rs. 2,29,000 and 1,00,000 respectively amongst women players. Out of the 52 Inter College competitions organised by competition Guru Nanak Dev University organised 52 Inter College & Our College participated in 49 and got 47 positions out of which Twenty Seven Championships i.e Canoeing, Rope Malkhumb, Pistol Shooting,  Rowing, Table Tennis, Tug of War, Judo, Yoga, Kayaking, Lawn Tennis, Archery Wooden, Wushu, Power lifting, Weight Lifting, Road Cycling, Track Cycling, Basketball, Wrestling, Fencing, Rifle Shooting, Boxing, Softball, Korfball, Baseball, Yachting, Kick Boxing and Netball, Seven teams got 1st Runners up positions in Chess, Handball, Squash Racket, Kabbadi (c/s), Gymnastic Artistic, Football, and Cricket and Nine teams got 2nd Runners up positions i.e. Ball Badminton, Badminton, Archery Compound, Archery Recurve, Hockey, Indoor Hockey, Rugby, Kabaddi (n/s) and Swimming.
Department of Life Sciences 
The College is re-accredited with ‘A’ Grade by NAAC, acclaimed as ‘Star College’ by Department of Biotechnology, Govt. of India, and College with ‘Potential for Excellence’ by UGC, the college offers an ideal blend of tradition & modernity, science and social concerns, moral values and entrepreneurial acumen.

See also

 Arya Samaj

References

Education in Amritsar
Science and technology in Amritsar
Universities and colleges affiliated with the Arya Samaj
Buildings and structures in Amritsar
1967 establishments in Punjab, India
Educational institutions established in 1967